Larry D. Lambert Jr. is an American politician. He is a Democratic member of the Delaware House of Representatives, representing District 7.

Lambert is part of the progressive wing of the Democratic Party, and is an advocate for policies such as universal healthcare, a $15 an hour minimum wage, police reform, and the legalization of marijuana. He was one of a number of progressive candidates that defeated incumbent centrist Democrats in the 2020 state Democratic primaries. Lambert defeated centrist incumbent Democrat Ray Seigfried in the 2020 primary with 59% of the vote. He had previously been the runner-up in the 5-way primary race in 2018, receiving 25.5% of the vote while Seigfried won with 28.7%. Lambert won the general election on November 3, 2020, with 67% of the vote over Republican candidate James Haubrich and Libertarian Party candidate Scott Gesty. In 2022, Lambert won the Democratic primary unopposed, going on to defeat his Republican opponent, Shane Stoneman by a near 43-point landslide with 71% of the vote.

References

External links
Official page at the Delaware General Assembly
Campaign site
 

Living people
Democratic Party members of the Delaware House of Representatives
African-American state legislators in Delaware
People from New Castle County, Delaware
21st-century American politicians
21st-century African-American politicians
Year of birth missing (living people)